Gilbert J. Henderson (5 September 1926 – 30 January 2017) was a Canadian sports shooter. He competed in the trap event at the 1960 Summer Olympics.

References

1926 births
2017 deaths
Canadian male sport shooters
Olympic shooters of Canada
Shooters at the 1960 Summer Olympics
Sportspeople from Toronto